Myceligenerans is a Gram-positive, spore-forming and mycelium-forming bacterial genus from the family of Promicromonosporaceae.

References

Micrococcales
Bacteria genera